The Open University of China was established in Beijing in 1979. It formerly known as China Central Radio and TV University (中央广播电视大学 or 中央电大), which reflects its heritage of providing a system of higher education through radio and television. The university is directly under the supervision of the Ministry of Education. The current president is Dr. Ge Daokai, Sun Lüyi, Li Linshu and Yan Bing are vice presidents, and Zhang Hui is party secretary of the university.

Currently, most courses are blended between face-to-face sessions and online/distance learning. It operates through 44 provincial radio and television universities (PTVUs), 279 prefectural/civic branch schools and 625 district/county work stations.

The RTVU system employs nearly 85,000 staffs (including 52,600 full-time staffs). ref>http://unesdoc.unesco.org/images/0014/001412/141218e.pdf#85 </ref> It offers 75 majors in 9 disciplines and 24 specialties including science, engineering, agricultural science, medicine, literature, law, economics, management, and education.

Faculties 
 Faculty of Arts and Law
 Faculty of Economics and Management
 Faculty of Engineering
 Faculty of Teacher Education
 Faculty of Foreign Languages
 Faculty of Agroforestry and Medicine.

Memberships 
 Asian Association of Open Universities (AAOU): Joined on 1993
 International Council of Distance Education (ICDE): Joined on 1997

References 

 About the Open University of China
 China's Radio & TV Universities and The British Open University: A comparative study. Wei Runfang. Yilin Press 2008. 
 World Bank's history of CRTVU

External links 
  

Distance education institutions
Universities and colleges in Haidian District
Educational institutions established in 1979
1979 establishments in China
Distance education institutions based in China
Open universities